National Route 351 is a national highway of Japan connecting Nagaoka, Niigata and Ojiya, Niigata in Japan, with a total length of 38.7 km (24.05 mi).

References

National highways in Japan
Roads in Niigata Prefecture